Luigi Lavecchia (born 25 August 1981 in Turin) is an Italian former footballer who played for as a defender. He is a current manager.

Career

Lavecchia was born in Turin and started out as a youth player with home-town club Juventus. He had then spells in Serie B with five different clubs: Crotone, Ascoli, Messina, Arezzo, Bologna and in Ligue 1 with Le Mans.

Bologna
In the summer of 2007, Luigi Lavecchia signed with the Serie B team Bologna with whom he promoted to Serie A.

Romania
In February 2011, he signed with the Romanian club FCM Târgu Mureş to play in Liga 1.

References

External links

1981 births
Living people
Italian footballers
Italy under-21 international footballers
Le Mans FC players
A.C.R. Messina players
S.S. Arezzo players
Bologna F.C. 1909 players
F.C. Crotone players
Ascoli Calcio 1898 F.C. players
Juventus F.C. players
Serie A players
Serie B players
Ligue 1 players
Liga I players
Association football midfielders
Association football defenders
Footballers from Turin
Italian expatriate footballers
Expatriate footballers in France
Expatriate footballers in Romania
Italian expatriate sportspeople in France
Italian expatriate sportspeople in Romania
Association football utility players
ASA 2013 Târgu Mureș players
S.E.F. Torres 1903 players